City National Bank (CNB) is a bank headquartered at City National Plaza in Los Angeles, California. CNB is a subsidiary of the Toronto-based Royal Bank of Canada and it is the 35th largest bank in the United States .

CNB has been dubbed the "Bank to the Stars" due to its extensive relationships with numerous Hollywood entertainment industry clients, and deals with many exclusive and premier clients from various media, including television, film, theater and the arts.

Management
The bank had total assets of $91 billion (as of June 1, 2022). It offers a full complement of banking, trust and investment services through 75 offices, including 19 full-service regional centers, in Southern California, the San Francisco Bay Area, Nevada, New York City, Minneapolis, Nashville, Washington, DC and Atlanta. After the closure or merger of many Los Angeles banks, it has become the largest bank headquartered in the Greater Los Angeles Area. It also acts as a processing bank, providing back office services such as checking account processing and check clearance services for smaller local banks that do not do their own processing. In addition, the company manages $71.7 billion in client investment assets.

It is a national bank, regulated by the Office of the Comptroller of the Currency of the United States Department of the Treasury. It has been a wholly owned subsidiary of the Royal Bank of Canada since 2015.

History

The bank was founded in 1954 by Alfred S. Hart. He hired Benjamin N. Maltz as the first chairman of the board. Its offices were in Beverly Hills at 400 North Roxbury Drive until 2004 when its headquarters were relocated to Arco Plaza (later City National Plaza) in Los Angeles.

In 1963, when Frank Sinatra's son was kidnapped, the bank put up the $240,000 demanded as ransom money. In 1970, its stock began trading over the counter.

In the 1990s, it acquired seven banks: First Los Angeles Bank (1995), Ventura County National Bank (1997), Frontier Bank (1997), Riverside National Bank (1997), Harbor Bank (1998), North American Trust Company (1998), and American Pacific State Bank (1999). In 2000, the bank expanded into Northern California in with the purchase of The Pacific Bank, followed by the acquisition of the Oakland-based Civic BanCorp in 2002. It had also acquired The Pacific Bank in 2000 as well as Reed, Conner & Birdwell and the People's Bank of California in 2001.

In 2002, City National opened an office in New York City to serve its California-based clientele who do business on both coasts, as well as prospective clients in Manhattan. In that decade, it continued to acquire more banks: Convergent Capital Management, LLC (2003), Business Bank of Nevada (2006), Convergent Wealth Advisors (2007), Lee Munder Capital Group (2009), Imperial Capital Bank (2009).

It then acquired two more banks in 2010: 1st Pacific Bank and Sun West Bank. In mid-2011, the bank opened a branch in Nashville, Tennessee. In 2012, it acquired Rochdale Investment Management and First American Equipment Finance.

City National Bank was formerly known as City National Bank of Beverly Hills and changed its name to City National Bank in February 1964.

On January 22, 2015, City National announced a "definitive agreement" to be acquired by the Royal Bank of Canada.

On April 11, 2017, City National opened its first full-service branch at RBC Plaza in Minneapolis, in conjunction with RBC Wealth Management.

On October 25, 2018, City National announced that Kelly Coffey would become its first female CEO from February 2019 becoming only the 4th CEO in the bank's history.

On January 12, 2023, City National agreed to pay $31,000,000 to resolve allegations of redlining from 2017 to at least 2020, brought by the United States Department of Justice.

Sponsorship
The most notable of City National Bank's sponsorships is its sponsorship of the Vegas Golden Knights of the National Hockey League which includes the naming rights to the team headquarters and practice facility City National Arena.

It previously sponsored the LA Galaxy amongst other sports teams.

The Bank is also the Official Bank of the Los Angeles Clippers, as well as the main sponsor of The Tony Awards.

References

External links
 

Companies formerly listed on the New York Stock Exchange
Banks based in California
Companies based in Los Angeles
Banks established in 1954
1954 establishments in California
2015 mergers and acquisitions
Royal Bank of Canada
American subsidiaries of foreign companies